Behavior, or behaviour, is the way a person or animal acts and reacts.

Behavior or behaviour may also refer to:

Behaviour (journal), a scientific journal
 Behavior (film), a 2014 Cuban film
 Behaviour (Pet Shop Boys album), 1990
 Behaviour (Saga album), 1985

See also

 Ethology, the study of animal behavior
 Behaviorism, the systematic approach to understanding behavior
 Behavioralism, an approach in political science
 Good behaviour (disambiguation)
 Bad Behaviour (disambiguation)